Rena is a genus of snakes in the family Leptotyphlopidae. The genus is endemic to the New World. All of the species were previously placed in the genus Leptotyphlops.

Species
The genus Rena contains the following species, which are recognized as being valid.
Rena boettgeri 
Rena bressoni  – Michoacán slender blind snake
Rena dugesii  – Dugès's threadsnake
Rena dulcis  – Texas blind snake
Rena humilis  – western threadsnake
Rena iversoni 
Rena klauberi 
Rena maxima  – giant blind snake
Rena segrega  – Trans-Pecos blind snake
Rena unguirostris  – southern blind snake

Nota bene: A binomial authority in parentheses indicates that the species was originally described in a genus other than Rena.

Etymologies
The specific name, dugesii, is in honor of Mexican zoologist Alfredo Dugès.

The specific name, iversoni, is in honor of American herpetologist John B. Iverson.

References

Further reading
Baird SF, Girard C (1853). Catalogue of North American Reptiles in the Museum of the Smithsonian Institution. Part I.—Serpents. Washington, District of Columbia: Smithsonian Institution. xvi + 172 pp. (Rena, new genus, p. 142; Rena dulcis, new species, pp. 142–143; Rena humilis, new species, p. 143).

 
Snake genera